Hwang Yeon-Seok (born on October 17, 1973) is a retired South Korean football player who is currently coach of Cheonggu High School's team. He played in Seongnam Ilhwa Chunma for nine seasons. At Seongnam, he played 270 games and scored 55 goals, with 28 assists. 

At the end of the 2003 season, Hwang transferred to newly formed Incheon United. In Incheon, he played a total of 30 games and scored 3 goals. He played 29 games as a substitute. In 2006, he moved to Daegu FC and played two seasons. At Daegu he played 48 games, with 6 goals and 4 assists in total. In 2008, he moved to Korea National League side Goyang Kookmin Bank.

Club career statistics

External links
 
 N-League Player Record - 황연석 

1973 births
Living people
Association football forwards
South Korean footballers
Seongnam FC players
Incheon United FC players
Daegu FC players
Goyang KB Kookmin Bank FC players
K League 1 players
Korea National League players
K3 League players